The Contractual Mistakes Act 1977 was an Act of Parliament in New Zealand that codified into law the remedies for mistake previously available under common law. It was repealed by the Contract and Commercial Law Act 2017.

External links
Contractual Remedies Act [1977] text of the Act

Statutes of New Zealand
1977 in New Zealand law
New Zealand contract law